David Perdue (born 1949) was a U.S. Senator from Georgia from 2015-2021. 

Senator Perdue may also refer to:

Bev Perdue (born 1947), North Carolina State Senate
Sonny Perdue (born 1946), Georgia State Senate